Double Dunk is a basketball video game developed by Atari Corporation and released in 1989 for the Atari 2600. Programmed by Matthew Hubbard, who previously wrote Dolphin and Zenji for Activision, Double Dunk was one of the last games produced by Atari for its well-known console.

Gameplay

Double Dunk is a simulation of two-on-two, half-court basketball. Teams have two on-screen characters, a shorter "outside" man and a taller "inside" man. In a single-player game, the player controls the on-screen character closest to the ball, either the one holding the ball (on offense) or the one guarding the opponent with the ball (on defense). In two-player games, each player may control one of the two teams as in a one-player game, or both players may play on the same team against a computer-controlled opponent. At the start of each possession, both offense and defense select from a number of plays (such as the pick and roll on offense), then attempt to score or regain possession of the ball by intercepting or stealing it from the offense.

The game offers a number of player-selectable options. Games can be set to last a certain amount of time or until one team scores a certain number of points. Three-point shots can be turned on or off, as can a ten-second shot clock. Players may also choose to include foul detection and/or a three-second lane violation.

Legacy
Double Dunk was re-released in 2003 as part of the Atari Anthology collection.

References

External links
Double Dunk at Atari Mania
Double Dunk at AtariAge

1989 video games
Atari 2600 games
Atari 2600-only games
Atari games
Basketball video games
North America-exclusive video games
Multiplayer and single-player video games
Video games developed in the United States